Retinal rod rhodopsin-sensitive cGMP 3',5'-cyclic phosphodiesterase subunit gamma is an enzyme that in humans is encoded by the PDE6G gene.

Interactions 

PDE6G has been shown to interact with Beta adrenergic receptor kinase and Src.

References

Further reading

External links 
  GeneReviews/NCBI/NIH/UW entry on Retinitis Pigmentosa Overview